"Indian Lake" is a song with music and lyrics written by Tony Romeo. The song was recorded by the pop band The Cowsills, and included on their 1968 album Captain Sad and His Ship of Fools (MGM E/SE-4554).  Released as a single, the song reached No. 10 on the Billboard Hot 100, while reaching No. 6 on the Cash Box Top 100, and No. 3 on Canada's RPM 100. The song was ranked as the No. 51 Single of 1968 by Cashbox magazine in its year-ending December 28, 1968 issue. The single eventually sold over 1 million copies, and was later licensed for use in commercials for the Dodge Charger.

Chart performance

Weekly charts

Year-end charts

Cover versions
 Freddy Weller recorded the song in 1971 (U.S. #108) and took it to No. 3 on Billboards Hot Country Singles chart.
 Jan & Dean covered "Indian Lake", and it is included on their 1985 album Silver Summer.

Notes

External links
 

1968 songs
1968 singles
Number-one singles in New Zealand
Cowsills songs
Jan and Dean songs
Songs written by Tony Romeo
Freddy Weller songs